The National Hobo Convention  is held on the second weekend of every August since 1900 in the town of Britt, Iowa, organized by the local Chamber of Commerce, and known throughout the town as the annual "Hobo Day" celebration.  The National Hobo Convention is the largest gathering of hobos, rail-riders, and tramps, who gather to celebrate the American traveling worker.

Events
Events include a Hobo 5K & Hobo 10K Walk/Run, Hobo King & Hobo Queen coronation, Hobo Museum, Hobo Auction, Hobo Memorial Service, Hobo Sunday Outdoor Church Service, Hobo Classic Car Show, Hobo Arts and Crafts Show and various hobo musical entertainment. The Hobo Jungle is open to the public.

References

External links

WTOL news story
Hobo Convention - Tired of the sedentary life? Hitch a train to Iowa (article)
National Hobo Convention, Britt, IA, 1984
Travel Site Feature
Television News Story

August events
Tourist attractions in Hancock County, Iowa
Itinerant living
Hoboes
Festivals in Iowa
Festivals established in 1900
1900 establishments in Iowa